The 2008–09 season was Peterborough United's 49th year in the Football League and their first season in League One since the 2004–05 season, having been promoted from League Two in the previous season. Peterborough had a successful league campaign, finishing second, and in doing so, securing promotion to the Championship. Along with League One, the club also participated in the FA Cup, League Cup and Football League Trophy, in which they were knocked out in the third, first and second rounds respectively. The season covered the period from 1 July 2008 to 30 June 2009.

Squad

Fixtures and results

Football League One

League table

Matches

FA Cup

League Cup

Football League Trophy

References

Peterborough United F.C. seasons
Peterborough United F.C.